"Ayer Me Llamó Mi Ex" is a song by Argentine latin trap singer Khea featuring American bachata guitarist Lenny Santos. It was released on August 20, 2020. The music video for the song has more than 125 million views on YouTube. The song has over 115 million plays on Spotify.

Background
The song was produced by Nobeat, the video for the song was directed by Ballve. The song talks about a guy who gets a call from his ex-girlfriend just to see each other again. The song includes the collaboration of the former guitarist of the bachata group Aventura, Lenny Santos, merging bachata with trap.

The song was a trend in several countries, ranking at the top of the charts in Argentina and Spain, and it also obtained a gold record in Spain in three weeks.

Remix
On November 5, 2020, Khea released the remix of the song together with Dominican singer Natti Natasha and American singer Prince Royce. The song reached 2 million views on YouTube in just one day and made it to the top 10 in global trends on YouTube and Spotify.

Personnel
Credits adapted from Tidal.

 Khea – vocals 
 Lenny Santos – guitar
 Nobeat – producer
 Paris Eteine LaMotte – songwriter
 Mike Fuller – engineer
 Marcelo Mato – studio personnel
 Natti Natasha – vocals (remix)
 Prince Royce – vocals (remix)
 D'Lesly "Dice" Lora – songwriter (remix)
 Rafael A. Pina Nieves – songwriter (remix)
 Yonathan Then – songwriter (remix)
 Ronald López – songwriter (remix)
 Andrea Mangiamarchi – songwriter (remix)
 Antonio Oliver – studio personnel (remix)
 Joel White – studio personnel (remix)

Charts

Weekly charts

Monthly charts

Year-End charts

Certifications

See also
List of Billboard Argentina Hot 100 top-ten singles in 2020

References

2020 singles
2020 songs
Natti Natasha songs
Prince Royce songs
Songs written by Prince Royce
Interscope Records singles